Lake Erie and Western Depot Historic District is a national historic district located at Kokomo, Indiana.   The district includes seven contributing buildings and three contributing structures associated with the Lake Erie and Western Railroad train station at  Kokomo. It includes the American Craftsman style passenger and freight depot (1916), a three-story Romanesque Revival style brick building with a limestone facade (1906), a three-story Romanesque influenced brick building (c. 1910), the massive three-story Neoclassical style S. Tudor & Co. building (c. 1905), "The Conwell" (1913), and three sets of railroad tracks.

It was listed on the National Register of Historic Places in 2008.

References

Kokomo, Indiana
Historic districts on the National Register of Historic Places in Indiana
Railway stations on the National Register of Historic Places in Indiana
Romanesque Revival architecture in Indiana
Neoclassical architecture in Indiana
Historic districts in Howard County, Indiana
National Register of Historic Places in Howard County, Indiana
2008 establishments in Indiana
Transportation buildings and structures in Howard County, Indiana